Albert C. Johnston (born 1900/1901 – June 23, 1988) was a doctor who, along with his family, passed as white in Gorham and then Keene, New Hampshire. William Lindsay White wrote a Reader's Digest article about the family and a short book was published from it in 1948. In 1949 a film adapted from the book about the family was released. Both the film and book were titled Lost Boundaries and were based on the family's experiences. In 1989 a follow-up film, Lost Boundaries Reunion was made with interviews of family members.

Johnston was from Chicago and studied at Rust College. He interned at Maine General Hospital. Johnston had trouble finding work but was eventually able to secure employment as a doctor by passing as white. He was a country doctor and radiologist in Gorham and Keene, New Hampshire. He entered the Navy as a commissioned officer but the offer was rescinded. He eventually uncovered that the decision was a result of his ethnic background.

His son, Albert C. Johnston Jr., one of four children, composed music including songs used in the film about the family. After working in Keene until the mid-1960s, Johnston Sr moved to the island of Kauai and worked as a radiologist at Wilcox Memorial Hospital; he died at the age of 87 at Castle Medical Center after being treated for chest congestion. He was buried in Keene.

Except for supporting cast members, white actors were used for the film. The film was banned in Atlanta and Memphis.

A high school student wrote about Johnston and his home in 2001. In 2013, Stanford University professor Allyson Hobbs wrote about the Johnstons and their passing in her book A Chosen Exile: A History of Racial Passing .

References

External links
 

Year of birth missing
1988 deaths
African Americans in New Hampshire